The following is a non-exhaustive list of K-pop videos that have been banned by one or more South Korean television networks, for reasons such as suggestive or offensive lyrics and imagery.

K-pop is a genre of modern pop music that originates from South Korea. It is characterized by a wide variety of audiovisual elements, and K-pop singles will typically include a music video and a dance routine. There is a history of media censorship and conservatism in South Korea, and as a result, many risque or explicit K-pop songs or videos have been banned by South Korean broadcasting stations. Other reasons for banning include having Japanese lyrics, negatively influencing youth, or the use of brand names.

KBS, MBC, and SBS are the three largest broadcasting and television networks, and they account for the vast majority of banned K-pop videos. As of September 2012, these networks had banned over 1,300 K-pop songs in the past three years alone. This list only includes titular k-pop songs that have an accompanying music video, but many K-pop songs that were not title tracks have been banned as well.

List of banned K-pop videos from KBS, SBS, and MBC

Aftermath of bans

Revising 
Often, the entertainment company that owns the banned song will try to revise the song and have it reevaluated by the broadcasting company. They may edit the music video and delete the controversial scenes and re-release the new video. Other times, they may alter the explicit dance moves or change a song's lyrics so that the song may still be performed on music shows, such as Music Bank. In the case of EXO's "Lotto," which was banned due to the title being a brand name, the group sang the word "louder" instead of "lotto" while performing the song live. This revision allowed the song to be performed on KBS and MBC music shows.

Although K-pop songs and videos are often banned by KBS, is it less often for MBC or SBS to place a ban. Some groups are content to promote themselves on networks other than KBS and do not make any changes to their original material. In regards to PSY's "Gentlemen," a spokesperson for YG Entertainment said they had no plans to submit a different version of their video, and they followed the decision made by KBS.

When 12 out of 18 songs of Cheetah's album was deemed unfit for broadcast by KBS and five by SBS, the agency stated that they did not plan on making any changes to the lyrics in order to "keep the original intentions and meanings of the song."

See also 

 Censorship of Japanese media in South Korea

References

Lists of songs
Lists of music videos
Lists of musical works
Korean Broadcasting System
Munhwa Broadcasting Corporation
Seoul Broadcasting System
Censorship in South Korea
Censorship of music
K-pop lists
Lists of banned works